Changshou is a district in  Chongqing, China, located by the Yangtze river, with a history spanning several thousand years.

Administrative divisions

History
Changshou has a history of 2300 years.
In 316 BC, a Zhi county was established.
In 226 AD, it was renamed Jiangzhou county.
In 519, it was renamed as Lewen county.
In 1362, it was renamed as Changshou county.
In 1959, Changshou County was put under the administration of Chongqing city.
In 2002, Changshou County was changed into Changshou District and it is a district in Chongqing city.

Population
Until the end of 2013, there are 369321 households, the total population is 906732. Among them, the non-agriculture population is 310531, agriculture population is 596201.

Geography
Changshou is located in 106°49’22” E107°27’30”E of longitude and 29°43’ N30°12’30”N of latitude, . Changshou is classified as shallow hill area, slopes in the area are relatively smooth.

Climate

Transportation
Chongqing- Fuling Freeway and other two freeways are intersected in Changshou area. Chongqing- Wanzhou Railway is under construction to provide transportation for businesses and tourists.  Changshou has two Yangtze River crossings, a road and a railway bridge.

Changshou District is 50 kilometers away from Chongqing Jiangbei International Airport.

Economy
In 2006, the total annual GDP was CNY 8.8 billion.

Tourism

Mount Puti is a tourist attraction in the district.

Special Local Product
 Changshou Grapefruit 
 Changshou Rice Noodle 
 Blood Tofu

Sister city

Notes

External links
Government website of Changshou (in Simplified Chinese)

 
Districts of Chongqing